Justyn may refer to:

 Justyn Cassell (born 1967), former English rugby union player
 Justyn Knight (born 1996), Canadian long-distance track runner
 Justyn Pogue, American artist and musician
 Justyn Ross (born 1999), American football wide receiver
 Justyn Warner (born 1987), Canadian track athlete
 Justyn Węglorz (born 1958), Polish former basketball player

See also 
 Justan (disambiguation)
 Justen (disambiguation)
 Justin (disambiguation)
 Juston (disambiguation)